Eu Só Quero Ser Livre (I Just Want To Be Free) is the debut album, released in 2006, from Brazilian singer Perlla.  It was the debut album which was popular in Brazil.

Track listing

"Eu Vou" (I go)
"Tremendo Vacilão" (Tremendous Vacillator)
"Totalmente Demais" (Totally Awesome)
"Estórias de Caô" (Stories of Lie)
"Já Não Somos Mais Livres" (Already We Are No More Free)
"Cansado" (Tired)
"Pára de se Iludir" (Stop To Illude Yourself)
"Beijo Bom" (Good Kiss)
"Groove Dance"
"Depois do Amor" (After Love)
"Tudo Bem" (Everything Well)
"Males" (Bads)
"Eu Vou" (Extended)
"Groove Dance" (extended)

Singles

 Totalmente Demais - 2006
 Tremendo Vacilão - 2006
 Eu Vou - 2007

References 

2006 debut albums
Perlla albums